Mount Smart Stadium (formerly known as Ericsson Stadium) is a multipurpose stadium in Auckland, New Zealand. It is the main home ground of the New Zealand Warriors of the National Rugby League, and occasionally hosts rugby union and international rugby league matches. Built within the quarried remnants of the Rarotonga / Mount Smart volcanic cone, it is located 10 kilometres south of the city centre, in the suburb of Penrose.

History

The Mount Smart Domain Board was established in 1943 with the purpose of transforming the former quarry site into a public reserve.  In 1953, a plan was approved for a sports stadium which was officially opened in 1967. In 1978, it hosted 3 matches of the World Series Cricket tour of New Zealand. The stadium hosted track and field events including the highly successful Pan Am series during the early 1980s.

During the 1988 Great Britain Lions tour the Auckland rugby league team defeated the tourists 30–14 at Mt Smart before a crowd of 8,000. Mount Smart hosted its first rugby league international on 23 July 1989 when New Zealand and Australia played the third test of the Kangaroos 1989 New Zealand Tour. In front of 15,000 fans, Australia defeated the Kiwis 22–14 to wrap up the series 3–0.

The stadium was chosen as the Main Athletics Stadium as well as the opening and closing ceremonies venue of the 1990 Commonwealth Games. It was where the New Zealand national football team (the All Whites) played all their home qualifying games for the 1982 FIFA World Cup. This was the first occasion that New Zealand had qualified for a FIFA World Cup and the event captured the imagination of the nation with large crowds packing the stadium.

Adele holds the attendance record of the stadium, with 45,000 fans, who saw her play at Adele Live 2017. Ericsson Stadium was the host of the Super League's 1997 World Club Championship Final between Australian teams the Brisbane Broncos and Hunter Mariners. In front of 12,000 fans, the Broncos defeated the Mariners 36–12. Ericsson Stadium hosted three-quarters of the 1999 Rugby League Tri-nations' games, including the final, which New Zealand lost 20–22.

The stadium is now owned by the Auckland Council, following the merger of Auckland's regional authorities and managed by Auckland Stadiums. During the late 1980s and early 1990s, the back of the grandstand roof at Mount Smart was used for Bungee jumping. Following the first rugby league test at the stadium in 1989, Australian captain Wally Lewis and teammate Peter Jackson both 'took the plunge'.

Mount Smart Stadium also hosted the first standalone NRL Women's Premiership match between the New Zealand Warriors and St. George Illawarra Dragons on 22 September 2019. The Dragons won this match 26–6.

Naming rights

As of 12 July 2006, the stadium reverted to its original name, Mt Smart Stadium. In a press release, the Auckland Regional Council, owners of the stadium, stated they had considered other offers, but felt they did not suit. Auckland Regional Council did not actively pursue a replacement sponsor.

On 14 July 2017 the Stadium was temporarily renamed Manu Vatuvei Stadium for the Warriors vs Panthers game where the Warriors bid farewell to club legend Manu Vatuvei.

Tenants

It currently serves as the home ground for the New Zealand Warriors in the Australian National Rugby League and NRL Women's Premiership. It is the former home of the Football Kingz of the Australian National Soccer League; however, its A-League successor, the now defunct New Zealand Knights, played on the other side of Waitematā Harbour at North Harbour Stadium.

In 2022, the Moana Pasifika Super Rugby team will start playing at Mt Smart.

The Athletics Ground (officially Mt Smart Stadium Number 2) hosts athletics meets, right down to Primary School Level. It also holds local rugby league matches and serves as the home ground for the Auckland franchise in the Bartercard Premiership.

Rugby league test matches
A list of rugby league test and World Cup matches played at Mount Smart Stadium.

Concerts 
The capacity of the stadium for concerts is roughly 47,000 people. This can be expanded to 60,000 when the temporary north and south stands are installed. A list of concerts held at the stadium are included in the table below:

Mount Smart Stadium was the Auckland venue of the Big Day Out music festival until 2012. In 2014, Western Springs Stadium served as the venue for the festival in Auckland. Among the concerts hosted were Rainbow Warrior Benefit Concert (Greenpeace 1986) featuring multiple artists including Neil Young on acoustic guitar and Jackson Browne, Graham Nash, Topp Twins, Dave Dobbyn and a Split Enz reunion within Mt Smart Stadium.

An album of Maori artists who came to support the aims of the Mt. Smart Stadium project was released in 1981. It was called The Mauri Hikitia. It reached no 4 on the New Zealand charts. It featured Rhonda, Ken Kincaid, Deane Waretini, and the Lightwood family.

References

External links

Mount Smart Stadium official site

1967 establishments in New Zealand
Athletics (track and field) venues in New Zealand
Rugby league stadiums in New Zealand
Rugby League World Cup stadiums
Rugby union stadiums in New Zealand
Association football venues in New Zealand
Sports venues in Auckland
Music venues in New Zealand
1990 Commonwealth Games
Stadiums of the Commonwealth Games
New Zealand Warriors
1960s architecture in New Zealand
Moana Pasifika
Association football in Auckland